The Maryland Historical Trust is an agency of Maryland Department of Planning and serves as the Maryland State Historic Preservation Office. The agency serves to assist in research, conservation, and education, of Maryland's historical and cultural heritage. The agency is responsible for the management of thousands of historical sites located within the State of Maryland.

History
The agency was originally created in May 1961 as a quasi-public corporation for the purpose "of accepting and maintaining gifts of property and for assisting and encouraging preservation activities throughout the state."

Following the passage of the National Historic Preservation Act which created the National Register of Historic Places in 1966, then Governor Spiro Agnew appointed the Trust’s Director as the State Liaison Officer in 1967 and thus the Trust became the state historic preservation office.

The agency provides archeological surveys.

In 1974, the Maryland Historic Sites Inventory was created by an act of the Maryland Legislature, Annotated Code of Maryland, Article 41, Section 181 KA, 1974 Supplement.

Awards
The board of trustees awards the annual Maryland Preservation Awards.

See also
 List of Howard County properties in the Maryland Historical Trust
 List of Laurel Maryland properties in the Maryland Historical Trust

References

External links
 

Historical Trust
History of Maryland